Togan may refer to:
 Togan Gökbakar (born 1984), Turkish film director
 Zeki Velidi Togan (1890–1970), Turkish historian
, Japanese painter

See also
 Tagan (disambiguation)

Turkish masculine given names
Turkish-language surnames
Bashkir-language surnames
Japanese-language surnames